Theater Scena STU (Krakowski Teatr Scena STU) is located at 16 Krasinskiego Street in Kraków, Poland.  Established in 1966 by Krzysztof Jasiński, it started as a member of a group of nonprofessional student theaters. It is considered to be one of the city's most important cultural institutions.  The current artistic director is Krzysztof Jasiński.

Awards
 1975, Grand Prize, 11th annual Student Theatre Festival, Łódź, Poland

References

External links
 Official website 

Scena
Performing groups established in 1966